MWF may refer to:
 Marvin, Welch & Farrar, 1970 pop group
 Mauritian Wildlife Foundation, non-profit conservation agency based in Mauritius
 Medical Women's Federation, body representing woman doctors in the United Kingdom
 Millennium Wrestling Federation in New England, U.S.
 Minhaj Welfare Foundation, international relief/aid organisation
 Murrinh-patha language, ISO 639-3 code for an Australian aboriginal language
 HAL Tejas Mk2, commonly referred to as MWF (Medium Weight Fighter)